WWII is an abbreviation of World War II. It may also refer to:
WWII (album), a 1982 album by Waylon Jennings and Willie Nelson
WHYF, a radio station in Pennsylvania which used the call sign 'WWII' from 1984 to 2011
Call of Duty: WWII, a 2017 first-person shooter video game developed by Sledgehammer Games
"WWII", a song by Phinehas from the 2013 album The Last Word Is Yours to Speak

See also
WWI (disambiguation)